Jamshid Nassiri (born 15 March 1959 in Khorramshahr) is an Iranian-Indian football manager and former footballer, who is currently the technical director of Calcutta Premier Division side Peerless. Nassiri is known for forming a successful attacking duo with Majid Bishkar in the 80's. He was one of the most expensive player in Indian football during his playing days and is the first foreign player to score 100 goals across several tournaments in the country.

He has played for several clubs in India during his playing career. At international level, Nassiri has represented Iran at the 1977 FIFA World Youth Championship. Nassiri currently lives in Kolkata and holds the Indian citizenship.

Playing career
Nassiri started his career at Takht Jamshid Cup side Rastakhiz Khorramshahr, but it didn't last long as the club was shut down due to Islamic revolution. In 1979, he came to India to pursue his studies and joined the Aligarh Muslim University (AMU). On seeing his performance for the university in the North Zone Inter University championship, Nassiri was signed by East Bengal along with other Iranian players Majid Bishkar and Mahmud Khabbasi. The 1980 Federation Cup was his debut tournament with the Red and Golds, where he won the tournament with the them. In the same season, East Bengal also won the Rovers Cup where Nassiri played a big part.

In 1982, he was signed by Mohammedan SC. His transfer was very effective for the side as they were able to win the Federation Cup for the first time in its history. In 1984 Federation Cup final against East Bengal, he scored the winner.

His consistent form saw him returning to East Bengal in 1984 where Nassiri had an impressive run. He scored 17 goals in the Calcutta league and became the league's topscorer. He was also part of the team that won Federation Cup in 1985 and participated in 1985–86 Asian Club Championship in Saudi Arabia, under coaching of legendary footballer P. K. Banerjee. They also won the Coca Cola Cup of Central Asia.

In 1986, Nassiri had his last big transfer move, as he rejoined Mohammedan for a sum of Rs. 250,000, making him as one of the most expensive football player in the country at that time. He continued to play till the late 80's and became the first foreigner in Indian football to score more than 100 goals.

Managerial career

Nassiri enjoyed his playing days in India and began his coaching career in the Mumbai Super Division side Bengal Mumbai. He managed the club from 1998 to 2001 and helped them winning the Rovers Cup alongside Mumbai Super Division league in 1998. In 2003, Nassiri was appointed as technical director of Wari Athletic Club, which was then promoted to Calcutta Football League Super Division.

In 2003–04 season, he managed Mohammedan Sporting in the National Football League. In June 2022, Nassiri acquired post of technical director in Peerless ahead of the new season of Calcutta Premier Division League. He also guided the team reaching semi-final of Naihati Gold Cup.

Personal life

{{Cquote|I like India. I found the culture and tradition common to Iran. It was a great experience playing in front of such a massive crowd. That's the reason I preferred to stay back here."|source=Jamshid Nassiri, on his life in India and relation with the country.|Cquote}}
Since the 1980s, Nassiri lives in Kolkata. He is also a follower of Bengali traditions, foods and culture.

Nassiri is married to Susanne, who is born and brought up in India, and lives in Queens Mansion on Park Street. The couple has two sons, Jaswa and Kiyan Nassiri. His younger son Kiyan is a professional footballer, born in 2000, currently playing for Indian Super League side ATK Mohun Bagan. Kiyan began his youth football career in Mohammedan SC and then further with Mohun Bagan AC and currently plays professionally for ATK Mohun Bagan in the Indian Super League.

Honours
Player
East Bengal
Federation Cup: 1980–81, 1985
IFA Shield: 1986
Calcutta Football League: 1985
Darjeeling Gold Cup: 1985
Sait Nagjee Trophy: 1986
Stafford Cup: 1986

Mohammedan Sporting
Federation Cup: 1983–84, 1984–85
IFA Shield: runner-up: 1982
Rovers Cup: 1984; runner-up: 1982, 1983
Sait Nagjee Trophy: 1984
Bordoloi Trophy: 1985; runner-up: 1983
DCM Trophy: runner-up: 1982, 1983
Darjeeling Gold Cup: 1984

Individual
 Calcutta Football League top scorer: 1985 (with 17 goals)

Manager
Bengal Mumbai
Rovers Cup: 1998
Bombay Super Division League: 1998

See also

List of foreign players for SC East Bengal
List of Indian football players in foreign leagues

References

Further reading

Chatterjee, Partha. The Nation and Its Fragments: Colonial and Post-colonial Histories (Calcutta: Oxford University Press, 1995).

External links

 Jamshid Nassiri archive at The Times of India''
Interview of Jamshid Nassiri at Sportskeeda

Iranian football managers
Indian football managers
Iranian footballers
Indian footballers
Iranian expatriate footballers
Indian expatriate footballers
Iranian expatriate football managers
Living people
1959 births
People from Khorramshahr
East Bengal Club players
Association football forwards
Iranian expatriate sportspeople in India
Mohammedan SC (Kolkata) managers
Calcutta Football League players
Sportspeople from Khuzestan province